Antoine Gadon better known as Dunan Mousseux (1829 – Paris, January 1886) was a 19th-century French journalist, chansonnier and playwright.

A journalist by the Vieux père Grégoire, monthly, political and charivanic, founder in 1851 of the Pierrot, journal-programme des fêtes et des spectacles and of the Porte-Voix in 1856, he was editor of the paper Le Sans Gêne in 1861.

Works 
1846–1857: Chansons diverses
1848: L'Échafaud du peuple
1848: Le Bœuf gras du suffrage universel
1848: Tableau populaire. Les Trois jours
1848: Vive la République !, chant patriotique
1849: En prison !!!
1857: Complainte !!!
1858: Le Royaume du poète, comédie-vaudeville in 3 acts, drawn from songs by Béranger, with Édouard Montagne
1859: L'Orgueil, drama in 5 acts, with François Llaunet
1861: Le Doigt dans l’œil, review of the year 1860, in 3 acts and 20 tableaux, with Charles Potier
1865: Mes Mémoires, étude de mœurs parisiennes, rondeau
1865: Les Blanchisseuses de fin, play in 5 acts mingled with songs, with Hippolyte Lefebvre
1865: La Famille Mirliton, parodie-vaudeville of la Famille Benoiton in 5 acts, with Alexandre Flan and Alexis Bouvier
1866: Le Pays latin, drama in 5 acts mingled with song after the novel by Henry Murger, with Frédéric Voisin
1866: Les Cinq francs d'un bourgeois de Paris, comédie-vaudeville in 5 acts, with Victorien Sardou and Jules Pélissié
1872: Rabagas, comedy in 5 acts, in prose, with V. Sardou

Bibliography 
  Georges d' Heylli, Dictionnaire des pseudonymes, 1869,  (Read online)
 Pierre Larousse, Nouveau Larousse illustré, 1898, 
 Jean-Yves Mollier, Philippe Régnier, Alain Vaillant, La production de l'immatériel, 2008, 

19th-century French dramatists and playwrights
19th-century French journalists
French male journalists
French chansonniers
1829 births
1886 deaths
19th-century French male writers